Michel Pierre Marie Mathieu (born 25 July 1944 in Montpellier, France, died 1 October 2010 in France) was a French senior civil servant. He was High Commissioner of New Caledonia from 2005 to 2007 when he notoriously resigned after a disagreement with then Overseas Secretary Christian Estrosi. He served previously as High Commissioner of the Republic in French Polynesia (Le Haut-Commissaire de la République en Polynésie française) from 2001 to 2005, when he was succeeded by Anne Boquet.  He died in 2010.

Honours and decorations

National honours

Ministerial honours

Foreign honours

References

1944 births
2010 deaths
High Commissioners of New Caledonia
High Commissioners of the Republic in French Polynesia
Deaths from cancer in France
Officiers of the Légion d'honneur
Officers of the Ordre national du Mérite
French civil servants